Boris Terrel Lee (born May 4, 1987) is an American football linebacker who is currently a free agent. He was signed by the San Diego Chargers as an undrafted free agent in 2010. He played college football at Troy.

Lee has been a member of the San Diego Chargers, New York Jets and Jacksonville Jaguars of the NFL.

Professional career

San Diego Chargers
Lee was signed on May 20, 2010, but was later released on June 9, 2010.

New York Jets
Lee was signed to a contract by the Jets on August 19, 2010.  He was released by the Jets on September 3, 2010.

Jacksonville Jaguars
Lee was signed to the Jaguars practice squad on December 2, 2010.  His practice squad contract expired on January 11, 2011.

Tri-Cities Fever
In 2012, Lee signed with the Tri-Cities Fever of the Indoor Football League.

Personal life
He attended Clinch County High School in Homerville, Georgia.
He is also known as "The Legend" by his college teammates and coaches. His hero is the historical boxing champion Jack Johnson. Boris was dubbed "the smartest man in the NFL" by a financial advisor for his choice in vehicle; the very economical Toyota Corolla. He is also an active member of the Big Brothers Big Sisters program.

External links
 Jacksonville Jaguars Bio

1987 births
Living people
Players of American football from Georgia (U.S. state)
American football linebackers
Troy Trojans football players
San Diego Chargers players
New York Jets players
Jacksonville Jaguars players
Tri-Cities Fever players
People from Clinch County, Georgia